Wellington High School is a public high school located in the city of Wellington, Texas, in Collingsworth County, United States and classified as a 2A school by the UIL. It is a part of the Wellington Independent School District located in south central Collingsworth County. In 2015, the school was rated "Met Standard" by the Texas Education Agency.

Athletics
The Wellington Skyrockets compete in these sports - b

Baseball
Basketball
Cross Country
Golf
Football
Tennis
Track and Field

State Titles
Football - 
2013(1A/D2)
Girls Cross Country
2021(2A)

References

External links
Wellington ISD website

Public high schools in Texas
Schools in Collingsworth County, Texas